Penn Foster High School is a for-profit online high school based in Scranton, Pennsylvania. The high school is regionally and nationally accredited and is the largest and oldest high school in the United States.

It was founded in 1890 as the International Correspondence Schools (ICS). It offers a high school diploma program and several high school concentration programs including an early college program. This is ideal for students looking to get a head start on their college education and vocational concentrations in carpentry, plumbing, electrical, health care, or information technology.

History
In 1890, Thomas J. Foster, a newspaper editor, founded the International Correspondence Schools to provide coal miners with the education they needed to advance in their careers and increase worker safety. According to a history of ICS "the school's success is owed to its understanding the market and its prospective students. Influenced by the popular Horatio Alger books, people were looking to pull themselves up by their bootstraps and climb the social and economic ladder." Beginning in the 1890s, ICS received competition from state schools, including Penn State College. And by the 1920s, public education became more universal. As the popularity of correspondence schools waned, ICS lost students.

After several name changes in the 1990s, in 2006 ICS became Penn Foster High School, Penn Foster Career School, and Penn Foster College. In 2007, the Wicks Group, a private equity firm, bought the school from Thomson Corporation. In 2009, Penn Foster was resold to test preparation and educational support company The Princeton Review. In 2012, the Princeton Review brand name and operations were bought for $33 million by Charlesbank Capital Partners, a private-equity firm. The parent company was renamed Education Holdings 1, Inc.  In 2013, Education Holdings 1 filed for bankruptcy; it exited two months later. In 2014 Vistria Group, led by Martin Nesbitt, acquired Penn Foster.Bain Capital purchased Penn Foster from Vistria Group in 2018.

Academics
Penn Foster High School is an open enrollment institution. As an online school, students do not work directly with certified teachers. Rather, they complete classes in a correspondence school-like format. To obtain a high school diploma, students take a core curriculum of classes and five elective courses. Students may use these elective courses to focus on specific industries, such as healthcare, information technology, or building technology, or may take approved college level courses. Students and graduates can access Penn Foster Career Services, which helps students find a job through resume and cover letter preparation, job search assistance, and interview tips. According to the Pennsylvania Department of Education, Penn Foster High School has 11.5 FTE (full-time equivalent teachers) for about 13,000 students.

Student outcomes
According to the company, about 30,000 people graduate each year.

Accreditation
Penn Foster High School is regionally accredited for grades 9-12 by the Middle States Commission on Secondary Schools (MSCSS). and nationally accredited by the DEAC.  Penn Foster High School is also accredited by AdvancED Penn Foster High School is not licensed by the Pennsylvania Department Of Education. It is registered with the NCAA Eligibility Center. The parent company is an accredited business by the Better Business Bureau and has a A+ rating and 219 complaints in the last three years.

Social groups and clubs

Photography Club
Friends of Hope
20's Club
DIY Club
Cooking Club
Night Owls
Stand Strong
Book Club
Environmental Club
Student Council
Science Club
Quote Club
Words of Faith
Penn Foster Pet Club
Writers and Poetry Club

Notable alumni 

 Santiago Espinal, baseball infielder

References

External links

Distance education institutions based in the United States
Distance Education Accreditation Commission
Private high schools in Pennsylvania
1890 establishments in Pennsylvania